The 17th Provincial Assembly of Punjab was the legislature of Punjab, Pakistan following the 2018 provincial election to the Provincial Assembly of the Punjab.

On 23 May 2022, the Election Commission of Pakistan officially de-notified 25 dissident Pakistan Tehreek-e-Insaf MPAs who voted for the Pakistan Muslim League (N)'s Hamza Shahbaz in the Punjab chief minister election.

On 12 January 2023, Chaudhry Pervaiz Elahi sent a summary to dissolve the Assembly to the Governor of Punjab. The Assembly was dissolved after 48 hours at 10:10 PM (PST) on 14 January 2023.

Members

Membership changes

References

2018 Pakistani general election
Lists of current office-holders in Pakistan
@